Françoise Harteveld (born 26 March 1977 in Maassluis, South Holland) is a Dutch judoka. She began her judo career at the age of 3 at Budosport Mahorokan in Maassluis. Her JudoDad, Coos Henneveld (died January 2015) was her mentor and taught her all her skills. Later, his son Rob Henneveld was her coach, and with him she won as many titles and medals as under her JudoDad.

In 2006, she took up amateur sumo, and at her first tournament she ranked in the top 5 at the World Sumo Championships in Osaka. After her start in this other traditional Japanese sport, she won three silver medals in a row at the 2007 World Championships in Changmai, 2008 in Rakvere and 2010 in Warsaw. 

Participant in Olympic Team during Qualification for Sydney 2000 & Athens 2004,
4x Sportswoman of the Year of the City Maassluis 2003 / 2008 / 2011 / 2012,
Awarded with the Bowl of the City Maassluis 1998,
Winner of the Sports Career Award of the City Maassluis 2015,
Awarded with the Golden Citizenship "Gouden Erepenning der Gemeente Maassluis".

Other medals: World University Championships 2nd (2000) 3rd (1996/1998/2000),
5th World Judo Championships (1997) 7th (1999/2001/2003),
European Team Championships 3rd (2000), and
European Club Cup Final 3rd (1999).
Winner of the National Championships Women Team in Belgium (Participant/Coach) – Judo (2009/2010/2012/2013)

Silver at the European Championships – Judo Belt Wrestling

 3rd World Championships – Sumo – (2012)
 1st European Championships – Sumo – (2012) Heavy & Open 
 3rd European Championships – Sumo – (2011) Heavy & Open
 2nd World Championships – Sumo – (2010)
 4th Combat Games Beijing – Sumo (2010)
 1st Europe Cup Teams – Sumo (2010)
 2nd European Championships – Sumo (2010)
 1st Europe Cup Teams – Sumo (2009)
 Semi-final World Games Kaohsiung (2009) – Sumo
 2nd World Championships – Sumo – (2008)
 2nd World Championships – Sumo – (2007)
 3rd World Championships Teams – Sumo – (2007)
 3rd European Games – Sumo – (2007)
 3rd European Championships – Sumo – (2007)
 1st Barcis Cup – Sumo (2009/2010)
 1st Milan Open – Sumo – (2007/2008/2009/2010/2011)
 2nd Erd Cup – Sumo – (2011/2012)

Achievements

External links
 

1977 births
Living people
Dutch female judoka
Sportspeople from Maassluis
Competitors at the 2009 World Games